This is the discography of American record producer, Wheezy. It includes a list of songs produced, co-produced and remixed by year, artists, album and title.

Charted singles

Other charted songs

Production credits

2013 
Jose Guapo – Lingo
06. "Honey Bunz" (featuring XVL Ashton)

Shad da God – Gas Life
04. "Bizness"
06. "No Otha Way"
11. "Regardless" (featuring Big Kuntry King)

Shad da God
00. "Fuck Dese Niggas" (featuring Young Scooter)

2014 

Shad da God
00. "No Fold"

Jose Guapo
00. "No Noise" 

Birdman, Young Thug and Rich Homie Quan – Rich Gang: Tha Tour Pt. 1
11. "Milk Marie" (Rich Homie Quan)

2015 

Beatmonster Marc and Wheezy
00. 1500 (featuring Rich Homie Quan, Peewee Longway and Lil Boosie) 

Young Thug – Barter 6
01. "Constantly Hating" (featuring Birdman)
05. "Never Had It" (featuring Young Dolph)
06. "Dream" (featuring Yak Gotti)
07. "Dome" (featuring Duke)
09. "Amazing" (featuring Jacquees)
10. "Knocked Off" (featuring Birdman) 
11. "OD"
13. "Just Might Be"

Rich Homie Quan – If You Ever Think I Will Stop Goin' In Ask Double R
19. "Set It Off"

Shad da God
00. Stunt Sometime (featuring TK Kravitz) 

Young Thug – Slime Season
17. "Wood Would"

Shad da God – 2000 and God
01. Hold My Cup (featuring Young Thug) 
02. Fold
03. Stix
04. Throwed (featuring Yung Booke)
05. Blocked Em In 
06. Larceny
07. Bullshit (featuring Young Dro)
08. Who Said (featuring Zach Farlow)
09. Money Need Room 
10. Gold BB's (featuring T.I.)
12. Moonrocks
14. No No No (featuring T4 Tha Gr8)
15. Would You Ride (featuring Rich Homie Quan)

Lil Uzi Vert – Luv Is Rage
09. "Queso" (featuring Wiz Khalifa) 

Young Thug – Slime Season 2
05. "She Notice"
09. "I'll Tell You What" 
10. "Mind Right"
12. "Pull Up on a Kid" (featuring Yak Gotti)
13. "Up"
17. "Beast" 

Bryyce
00. Shade 

21 Savage – Slaughter King
06. "Mind Yo Business"

Beatmonster Marc and Wheezy
00. Khally (featuring Rich Homie Quan) 

Kid Ink
00. "No Pretending"

2016 

Young Thug – I'm Up
02. "My Boys" (featuring Trouble, Ralo and Lil Durk)
03. "For My People" (featuring Duke)
04. "King Troup"
05. "Ridin" (featuring Lil Durk)

Bankroll Mafia – Bankroll Mafia (album)
06. "Neg 4 Degrees" (featuring Young Thug, Lil Duke and Shad da God)
08. "My Bros" (featuring Lil Duke, Shad da God and Yung Booke)
09. "Up One" (featuring Shad da God, Offset and Quavo)
13. "Smoke Tree" (featuring T.I., Shad da God and London Jae)
14. "WCW" (featuring T.I., Young Thug, Shad da God and Lil Duke)
17. "Bankrolls on Deck" (featuring T.I., Young Thug, Shad da God and PeeWee Roscoe)

21 Savage [Slaughter king mixtape]
"Mind yo business"

Lil Duke – Uber
02. "Personality"
05. "Change Your Life" (featuring Anthony Hamilton)
06. "Know Ima Stunt" (featuring Ralo) 
07. "Never Had Shit" (featuring 21 Savage)
08. "Whole Lotta" (featuring Gunna) 
09. "Know Ima Get It" (featuring Lil Yachty) 
12. "Cant Have Me" (featuring Dolly)

Domani
00. "Poppin" 

Shad da God – Free Tha Goat
02. "6 Rings"
07. "Trap Talk"
13. "Torch"
14. "Pink Nucca" (featuring Chi Chi)

Shad da God
00. "Silk Da Shaka" 

Big Kuntry King
00. "How We Get Money" 

Shad da God
00. "420" 

Young Dro
00. "Drippin Sauce" 

Lil Durk – Lil Durk 2X
01. "Check"

Lil Duke – Blue Devil
03. "Stand Up Niggas" (featuring Young Thug) 
07. "Run It Up" 
10. "We Get It" (featuring Trae tha Truth)
11. "Gotta Be In You" (featuring Gunna)
12. "Water Water" (featuring Gunna) 

Young Thug – Jeffery
02. "Floyd Mayweather" (featuring Travis Scott, Gucci Mane and Gunna) 
03. "Swizz Beatz"
06. "Guwop" (featuring Quavo, Offset and Young Scooter) 
09. "Kanye West" (featuring Wyclef Jean) 

Various Artists – The Birth of a Nation: The Inspired By Album
04. "Oh Lord" (Gucci Mane and Lil Wayne)

Flyguy Tana – Never Had A Deal
03. "Ten Toes Down" (featuring MBC)
04. "They Don't See Da Score"
05. "Is Ya Wit It" (featuring R2R Mike)
06. "Spare None" (featuring Shad da God)

Wheezy
00. "200,000" (featuring Quavo, Lil Uzi Vert and Shad da God)

2017 

Future – Hndrxx
12. "I Thank U"

Lil Baby – Perfect Timing
06. "100 Round" (featuring Lil Yachty) 
11. "Our Year" (featuring Gunna)

Shad da God – God Gang
01. "God Gang"
03. "4th of July"
04. "Lotta Hox"
08. "Originator" 
10. "Them Boyz" (featuring Young Thug) 
11. "Zip Code"
12. "Michael Jackson" (featuring Lil Uzi Vert)

Lil Duke – Life in the Hills
01. "Intro"
02. "Light My Blunt" (featuring Gunna)
05. "Better Days"
06. "Billboard" (feat Wiz Khalifa and Dave East)
08. "Every Night" (feat Sonyae)
09. "Diamonds Dancing" (feat Young Thug) 
10. "Outro"
11. "Starve" (featuring Gunna)

Big Bank – King of the Jungle
07. 25 Squares (featuring Future)

Gunna – Drip Season 2
05. "Japan" 
08. "Make No Sense" (featuring Lil Duke) 
09. "Money Talking" (featuring Nechie) 
10. "Secure the Vibe" (featuring Young Thug)
11. "Ass" 
14. "Get It If You Want It" 

Young Thug – Beautiful Thugger Girls
01. "Family Don't Matter" (featuring Millie Go Lightly) 
07. "You Said" (featuring Quavo)
08. "On Fire" 
10. "Feel It"
12. "Oh Yeah"

21 Savage – Issa Album
12. "Special"
"Issa" (Unreleased) featuring Young Thug and Drake (musician)

Bobby Raps – Mark
13. "Back 2 Life" 

Meek Mill – Wins & Losses
07. "We Ball" (featuring Young Thug) 

Hustle Gang – We Want Smoke
08. "Gateway" (featuring Translee, Yung Booke, Tokyo Jetz and Ink) 

Young Thug and Carnage - Young Martha
03. "10,000 Slimes" 

Gunna - Drip or Drown
01. "Paid"
02. "Drip or Drown"
03. "Invest"
04. "Don't Give Up"
05. "Award"
06. "Don't Play With It" (featuring Young Thug)
07. "Dodge the Hate"

Future and Young Thug - Super Slimey
04. "200" 
08. "Drip On Me"

Travis Scott and Quavo - Huncho Jack, Jack Huncho
13. "Best Man" )

2018 
Future, Juice WRLD - Wrld On Drugs
02. "Astronauts"
03. "Fine China"
05. "Make It Back"
07. "7AM Freestyle"
08. "Different" 
09. "Shorty"
10. "Realer N Realer"
11. "No Issues"
13. "Afterlife"

Young Thug
00. "MLK" 

Migos - Culture II
12. "White Sand" ) 

Gunna - Drip Season 3
07. "Pedestrian" 
16. "Toast Up'
17. "Drip or Down (Remix)" 

Young Sizzle - Trap Ye Season 2
16. "OD" 

Rich The Kid - The World Is Yours
08. "Lost It" (featuring Quavo and Offset) 

Lil Baby - Harder Than Ever
05. "Yes Indeed" (with Drake) 

Nav - Reckless
12. "What I Need / Daheala Outro" 

Shad Da God - City Of God
12. "Prankster"
14. "Thumb Thru" )

Trippie Redd - Life's a Trip
06. Bird Shit (produced with We Are The Stars)

Young Thug - Slime Language 
01. "Tsunami" 
06. "Chanel (Go Get It)"  
07. "Dirty Shoes"  
08. "It's a Slime" )
11. "January 1st"  
12. "Chains Choking Me"  
Quavo - Quavo Huncho
04. "Flip the Switch"  

Tm88 and Southside

 00. "Hmmm" (featuring Valee and Lil Yachty) (produced with Tm88 and Southside)

Meek Mill - Championships

 09. "Going Bad" (featuring Drake) 
 14. "Pay You Back" (featuring 21 Savage 

21 Savage - I Am > I Was

 06. "1.5" (featuring Offset) (produced with Nils)
 08. "Can't Leave Without It" (featuring Lil Baby and Gunna)

2019 

Future - Future Hndrxx Presents: The WIZRD
05. "Crushed Up" (produced with Ricky Racks and Matt Cap
06. "F&N" (produced with Southside and ATL Jacob)
12. "Krazy But True" (produced with Frankie Bash, Corbin and Distance Decay)
16. "Goin Dummi"

Gunna - Drip or Drown 2
01. "Wit it"
04. "Cash war"
06. "Yao Ming"
07. "Idk Why"
09. "Baby Birkin" (Produced with Brackz)
11. "3 Headed Snake" (feat. Young Thug) (produced with Turbo and Charlie Handsome)
16. "Who You Foolin"Rich the Kid - The World Is Yours 2 04. "Fall Threw" (featuring Young Thug & Gunna) (produced with Nils)Trippie Redd - ! 10. "Mac 10" (feat. Lil Duke & Lil Baby)Yung Bans - Misunderstood 02. "SOS" (produced with Chopsquad DJ)
 12. "Hold Up" (featuring Gunna & Young Thug) (produced with Nils)Lil Gotit - Crazy But It's True 05. "Drip School" (featuring Lil Durk) (produced with Cubeatz)Bon Iver - i, i 02. "iMi" (drum programming)
 03. "We" (produced with Justin Vernon, Chris Messina, Brad Cook, BJ Burton & Andrew Sarlo)Young Thug - So Much Fun01. "Just How It Is" (produced with Nick Mira)
04. "Hot" (featuring Gunna)
07. "Bad Bad Bad" (featuring Lil Baby) (produced with Nils)
10. "I Bought Her" (featuring Lil Duke) (produced with DJ Durel)
16. "Circle of Bosses" (featuring Quavo) (produced with Nils)Trippie Redd - A Letter To You 419. "Chosen"A Boogie wit da Hoodie - Artist 2.0

 18. "Mood Swings"

2020 

Lil Baby - My Turn
14. "We Should" (featuring Young Thug)

Lil Uzi Vert - Eternal Atake
13. "Urgency" (featuring Syd)

Lil Uzi Vert - Eternal Atake (Deluxe) - LUV vs. the World 2
6. "Strawberry Peels" (featuring Young Thug & Gunna)

DaBaby - Blame It On Baby
4. "Talk About It"

Nav - Good Intentions
6. "No Debate" (featuring Young Thug)

Future - High Off Life
4. "Solitaires" (featuring Travis Scott) (produced with Mike Dean)
10. "Harlem Shake" (featuring Young Thug)

Gunna - Wunna
1. "Argentina"
2. "Gimmick"
9. "Blindfold (featuring Lil Baby)
10. "Rockstar Bikers & Chains"
11. "Met Gala"
12. "Nasty Girl/On Camera"
14. "I'm on Some"
15. "Top Floor" (featuring Travis Scott)
17. "Do Better"
23. "Relentless" (featuring Lil Uzi Vert)

Iann Dior - I'm Gone

9. "Prospect" (featuring Lil Baby) (produced with KBeaZy)

YoungBoy Never Broke Again - Top
8. "I'm Up" (produced with Selvziño)

Nav - Emergency Tsunami
1. "Breaking News Intro"
2. "Friends & Family"
4. "Nasty
5. "Repercussions" (with Young Thug)
6. "Vetement Socks"
7. "Don't Need Friends" (featuring Lil Baby)
8. "Make It Right Back"
9. "Trains" (with Lil Keed)
10. "Do Ya Deed" (featuring SahBabii)
11. "Droppin Tears"
12. "Modest"
13. "Turn & Twist"
14. "Breaking News Outro"
15. "Pickney"
16. "Stella McCartney" (featuring Future)

Playboi Carti - Whole Lotta Red

2. "Go2DaMoon" (featuring Kanye West)

2021 
Kanye West - DONDA

 7. "Jonah"
20. "Lord I Need You"

2022 
Gunna - DS4Ever

 1. "Private Island"
 2. "Pushin P" (featuring Future & Young Thug)
 3. "Poochie Gown"
 4. "Mop"
 13. "Too Easy" (featuring Future)
 20. "Too Easy Remix" (bonus track) (featuring Future & Roddy Ricch)
Future - I Never Liked You

 1. "712PM"
 10. "Chickens" (featuring EST Gee)
 21. "Worst Day"
Lil Durk - 7220

 25. "Smurk Outta Here"
 28. "Expedite This Letter”
Kanye West - Donda 2

 10. "Happy"

Notes

References

Production discographies
Hip hop discographies
Discographies of American artists